Vagharshak Hakobyan (born 1 January 1991), is an Armenian turkologist and politician, Member of the National Assembly of Armenia of My Step Alliance's faction.

Biography 
Vagharshak Hakobyan was born on January 1, 1991, in Tsakhkadzor, Armenia.

Education 
 1997–2007, secondary school of the city of Tsakhkadzor.
 2007–2011, graduated from the Faculty of Oriental Studies at Yerevan State University. Bachelor's degree. Turkologist.
 2013, graduated from the Faculty of Oriental Studies of the International Scientific Educational Center of National Academy of Sciences (NAS) of Armenia. Master's degree. Orientalist. 
 2013–2016, postgraduate study of the Faculty of Oriental Studies at the International Scientific and Educational Center of the National Academy of Sciences of Armenia. PhD in History.

Social and political activity 
 2012, established the Armenian Association of Young Politicians.
 2015–2016, lecturer at Yerevan French College and the European Regional Academy in Armenia.
 2018-January 14, 2019, assistant to the Minister of Diaspora of Armenia.
December 9, 2018 - Elected Member of the National Assembly of Armenia.

Scientific activity 
Author of a number of scientific articles.

References 

1991 births
Living people
21st-century Armenian politicians